Michael Oscislawski (born 16 January 1987 in Bytom) is a Polish-German footballer who plays for VfL Kemminghausen.

Career
Oscislawski played in the youth first for TuS Kruckel and red and white Barop before he moved to Borussia Dortmund. Here he played until the end of the 2005/06 season, mainly in the junior teams, but was already in the 2004/05 season as a substitute for first jobs to the seniors, whom he played for the reserve of Borussia in the Regionalliga Nord. In the summer of 2006 he was finally firmly integrated into the squad of the second men's team, however, remained in the following years additional players. In this role, he rose in the 2008/09 season with his team in the 3rd League on. There he was on 28 August 2009 his professional league debut in the 1:2 home defeat against SpVgg Unterhaching. He replaced while in the 72nd Minutes Julian Koch. On 22 May 2010 signed a two-year contract with Sportfreunde Lotte and joined official to his new club on 1 July 2010.

References

External links
 Profile at kicker.de

German footballers
Germany youth international footballers
Polish footballers
1987 births
German people of Polish descent
Borussia Dortmund II players
Sportfreunde Lotte players
Living people
Sportspeople from Bytom
3. Liga players
Regionalliga players
Association football midfielders
VfB Hüls players